Lower Boddington is a village about  southwest of Daventry in Northamptonshire. Lower Boddington is the smaller of the two villages in Boddington  civil parish, most of whose facilities are located in Upper Boddington.

The villages name means 'Bota's hill'.

Children from Lower Boddington are most likely to attend a primary school in Aston le Walls, Chipping Warden, Leamington Spa or Upper Boddington. Teenagers are likely to attend Chenderit School, Southam College, 
Princethorpe College or Blesséd George Napier RC School in nearby Banbury.

Lower Boddington has a public house, the Carpenters Arms, owned by the Hook Norton Brewery.

HS2
The UK government plans to build a second high-speed railway going from Birmingham to London, Lower Boddington is one of the villages whose residents have complained about the noise pollution the railway would  create and the lowering of house prices it would cause. Many posters and slogans have been put up in protest of the railway in the village and surrounding area, like many other towns and villages along the new line.

References

Villages in Northamptonshire
West Northamptonshire District